Ferdinand-Camille Dreyfus (Paris, 19 August 1851 – 1905) was a French journalist and politician, unrelated to his contemporary Captain Alfred Dreyfus.

After a classical and commercial education he prepared himself for the École Polytechnique, but on the outbreak of the Franco-Prussian War left his studies to serve as a volunteer. In 1873 he became editor of L'Avenir de la Sarthe and served five months in prison for opposing the dictatorship of MacMahon. He afterward controlled Le Libéral de la Vendée. In 1879, he became chief of the bureau of the financial under-secretary, and later represented the government at the Brussels Exhibition of 1880.

Becoming editor of La Lanterne in 1882, he founded two years later Le Matin. In December, 1882, he was chosen to represent the Gros-Caillou quarter in the municipal council of Paris, and was reelected in 1884. Dreyfus in this position showed a remarkable aptitude for finance. In October, 1885, he was elected deputy by the department of the Seine, and was reelected, for the Twelfth District, in 1889, in opposition to a Boulangist candidate. A radical, with wide schemes of reform, Dreyfus sat with the Extreme Left. He was appointed a member of the army commission, and also on that of espionage. He fought many duels, one with the Marquis de Morès, the anti-Semite. His publications include: Une Dictature (Le Mans, 1874); Giboyer à Saint-Pélagie (Paris, 1875); L'Evolution des Mondes et des Sociétés (Paris, 1888); Les Traités de Commerce (Tours, 1879); Le Tunnel du Simplon et les Intérêts Français (Paris, 1879); L'Angleterre, son Gouvernement, ses Institutions (Paris, 1881); La Guerre Nécessaire, Réponse d'un Français à M. de Bismarck (Paris, 1890). Dreyfus was also secretary and part founder of La Grande Encyclopédie. He was a member of the Légion d'honneur.

References

1851 births
1915 deaths
19th-century French journalists
French male journalists
Journalists from Paris
19th-century French Jews
French male writers
19th-century French male writers
French duellists
Politicians from Paris